Croppa Creek is a very small village and railway location in the Gwydir Shire, New South Wales, Australia. It was the site of a railway station on the Boggabilla branch between Moree and North Star from 1932 until 1976 and is still a seasonal loading point for freight trains carrying bulk grain. In the 2016 census, the area surrounding Croppa Creek had a population of 120.

The village was settled following the opening of the railway line, and grew through the 1930s and 1940s with new industry, agricultural areas and housing subdivisions established. Today, the main economic activity is mixed farming, with crops produced including wheat, barley, sorghum and cotton. Sheep and cattle grazing is also common in the area. Graincorp operate a wheat silo at Croppa Creek and the nearby Myola feedlot, a facility capable of handling 20,000 head of cattle further supports the local agriculture industry.

Despite Croppa Creek's size and isolation, recreational facilities and organisations are well represented in the village, including the local bowls club, a 9-hole golf course, tennis courts and Croppa Creek Crows (you wreck em', we treck em'), all built and upgraded with donations from the community. There is a small public school, catering from K–6 with an enrollment of just 11 students. Other amenities include the Croppa Creek General Store, the community hall and a Catholic church. The community relies on larger nearby towns such as North Star (28 km), Goondiwindi (95 km) and Moree (68 km) to access services not available locally.
There is a wide range of farmers in the community from grain farmers to cattle farmers.

References

North West Slopes
Towns in New England (New South Wales)
Gwydir Shire